What a Life! is the second studio album by Australian band Divinyls, released in October 1985 by Chrysalis Records. The album is a genre of rock and new wave songs—written by Divinyls members Christina Amphlett and Mark McEntee.

History
After touring and promoting in the United States, Divinyls came back to Australia to begin the follow-up to Desperate, with Mark Opitz producing again. They produced three songs including "Don't You Go Walking" and "Motion" but Amphlett and McEntee were not satisfied so they returned to the road, replacing drummer Richard Harvey with J.J. Harris, and wrote more songs. A year later they again tried recording, this time with the producer Gary Langan who was the founding member of the band Art of Noise. He brought a sophisticated, high-tech edge to Divinyls' sound, but a full album failed to get done. Recording stopped once more.

Eventually, Amphlett and McEntee made a journey to Los Angeles, where they asked pop producer Mike Chapman to come back with them to Australia and finish their second album. Chapman ended up producing only two songs: "Pleasure and Pain" (which he also co-wrote with Holly Knight) and "Sleeping Beauty". The album was released almost two years after recording began. It reached No.4 in Australia and No.91 in the US, while "Pleasure and Pain" hit No.11 in Australia and the lower reaches of the Top 100 in the US. Two later singles, "Sleeping Beauty" and "Heart Telegraph", charted moderately in Australia but did little in the US. Despite its Australian success, Chrysalis declared the album a failure.

Reception

Rolling Stone described the music as "loud and hard-edged, as purely physical as any metal band, but tempered with ... swaggering rowdiness". Ram magazine noted the band's writing had a newfound maturity, "verbalising adult fears and lingering adolescent yearnings". AllMusic's later review said many of the album tracks were hardly memorable and that the band's best strengths lay both in Amphlett's unique vocal delivery, and McEntee's bottom-heavy, grungy, guitar work.

Track listing

Australian release

US release

Charts

Personnel
 Christina Amphlett – vocals, writer
 Mark McEntee – vocals, guitar, keyboards, writer
 Richard Harvey – drums
 Bjarne Ohlin – vocals, guitar, keyboards, writer
 Rick Grossman – bass, writer
 Rick Chadwick – keyboards, programming
 Mars Lazaar – keyboards, programming
 Mary Bradfield Taylor – background vocals
 Simon Darlow – keyboards, programming
 Charles Fisher – producer, mixer
 Mike Chapman – producer, writer
 Gary Langan – producer
 Mark Opitz – producer
 Tom Colley – engineer
 John Bee – engineer
 Richard Meuke – engineer

Sales

|}

References

1985 albums
Chrysalis Records albums
Divinyls albums
Albums produced by Mike Chapman
Albums produced by Mark Opitz